Mario Alberto Arteaga Herrera  (born 29 November 1970) is a Mexican former professional footballer who played as a forward.

Playing career

Club
He played as forward during his career, beginning with Chivas in the 1990–91 season. During the following year, Arteaga led Chivas with 9 goals as the club reached the playoff phase. He struggled to recapture that form, however, scoring only 5 goals the next year and 3 goals with León during the 1993–94 season as his top-flight career began to wind down.

International
Arteaga was also a member of the Mexico national under-23 football team competing at the 1992 Summer Olympics in Barcelona, Spain. He appeared twice in the tournament, coming off the bench against Australia and playing from the start against Ghana.

Managerial statistics

Managerial statistics

Honours

Manager

CONCACAF U-17 Championship 2015 Gold Medal 
FIFA U-17 World Cup 2015 Fourth Place

References

External links
Liga MX Profile
Coach Bio U-17 (Spanish)

1970 births
Living people
Footballers from Guadalajara, Jalisco
Mexican people of Basque descent
Association football forwards
Mexican footballers
Olympic footballers of Mexico
Footballers at the 1992 Summer Olympics
C.D. Guadalajara footballers
Club León footballers
Club Universidad Nacional footballers
Mexican football managers
Dorados de Sinaloa managers